Phintia podarce is a moth of the  family Notodontidae. It is found from the lower Amazon to the Andean foothills of Peru.

External links
Species page at Tree of Life project

Notodontidae of South America
Moths described in 1854